The Waiwhakaiho River is a river of the Taranaki Region of New Zealand's North Island. One of many rivers and streams radiating from the slopes of Taranaki/Mount Egmont, it flows initially northeast before veering northwest to reach the Tasman Sea close to the New Plymouth suburb of Fitzroy. Near the sea, it is crossed by the coastal walkway, connecting New Plymouth with Bell Block via the Te Rewa Rewa Bridge.

The river is also bridged by SH3 and the Marton–New Plymouth railway line.

See also
List of rivers of New Zealand

References

External links

 1:50,000 map
 water quality at 6 sites
 floods 1916 1.5m, 1971 6m, 1997–2013 stopbanks
 SH3 bridges – 1843, 1859, 1907, 2014–2015 (2016 official opening)
 photos of railway bridge 1924, 2011
 Mangorei hydro electric power station
 Meeting of the Waters Scenic Reserve walks

Rivers of Taranaki
Rivers of New Zealand